This is an incomplete list of destinations served by CAAC Airlines. The airline was split into 6 airlines in 1988.

Africa 
 
 Addis Ababa - Addis Ababa Bole International Airport

Asia 
 
 Dhaka - Shahjalal International Airport
 
 Hong Kong - Kai Tak Airport
 
 Mandalay - Mandalay Chanmyathazi Airport
 Rangoon - Rangoon International Airport
 
 Phnom Penh - Phnom Penh International Airport
 
 Beijing
 Beijing Capital International Airport
 Beijing Nanyuan Airport
 Chengdu - Chengdu Shuangliu International Airport
 Chongqing - Chongqing Baishiyi Airport
 Dalian - Dalian Zhoushuizi International Airport
 Fuzhou - Fuzhou Yixu Airport
 Guangzhou - Guangzhou Baiyun International Airport
 Guilin - Guilin Qifengling Airport
 Haikou - Haikou Dayingshan Airport
 Hangzhou - Hangzhou Jianqiao Airport
 Harbin - Harbin Taiping International Airport
 Kunming - Kunming Wujiaba International Airport
 Lanzhou - Lanzhou Zhongchuan International Airport
 Lhasa - Lhasa Gonggar Airport
 Nanjing - Nanjing Dajiaochang Airport
 Nanning - Nanning Wuxu International Airport
 Ningbo - Ningbo Lishe International Airport
 Qingdao - Qingdao Liuting International Airport
 Sanya - Sanya Phoenix International Airport
 Shanghai
 Shanghai Hongqiao International Airport
 Shanghai Longhua Airport
 Shenyang - Shenyang Dongta Airport
 Tianjin - Tianjin Binhai International Airport
 Ürümqi - Ürümqi Diwopu International Airport
 Wuhan - Wuhan Wangjiadun Airport
 Xiamen - Xiamen Gaoqi International Airport
 Xi'an - Xi'an Xiguan Airport
 Xining - Xining Lejiawan Airport
 Yantai - Yantai Laishan Airport
 
 Jakarta
 Kemayoran Airport
 Soekarno–Hatta International Airport
 
 Baghdad - Saddam International Airport
 
 Nagasaki - Nagasaki Airport
 Osaka - Itami Airport
 Tokyo - Haneda Airport
 
 Kuwait City - Kuwait International Airport
 
 Ulaanbaatar - Buyant-Ukhaa International Airport
 
 Pyongyang - Pyongyang International Airport
  
 Hanoi
 Gia Lam Airport
 Noi Bai International Airport
 
 Manila - Ninoy Aquino International Airport
 
 Karachi - Jinnah International Airport
 
 Singapore - Changi Airport
 
 Bangkok - Don Mueang International Airport
 
 Sharjah - Sharjah International Airport

Europe
 
 Paris - Charles de Gaulle Airport
 
 Bucharest - Henri Coandă International Airport
 
 Irkutsk - International Airport Irkutsk
 Moscow - Sheremetyevo International Airport
 
 Zürich - Zürich Airport
 
 London - Gatwick Airport
 
 Frankfurt - Frankfurt Airport
 
 Belgrade - Belgrade Nikola Tesla Airport

North America
 
 Los Angeles - Los Angeles International Airport
 New York City - John F. Kennedy International Airport
 San Francisco - San Francisco International Airport
Canada
Toronto - Toronto Pearson International Airport
Vancouver - Vancouver International Airport

Oceania
 
 Sydney - Sydney Airport

References

Civil Aviation Administration of China
Lists of airline destinations